The Regional basketball competitions in Spain are competitions usually played in summer with the best teams in each Autonomous Communities.

Andalusia

Aragon
The Trofeo Gobierno de Aragón is played between the two representative teams in the Autonomous Community: Zaragoza and Peñas Huesca.

Basque Country

Canary Islands

Trofeo Gobierno de Canarias
This trophy was played between all the teams in National competitions from the Canary Islands. It was organized by the Regional Government and was contested between 2004 and 2011.

Performance by club

Copa Toyota
The Copa Toyota is a tournament played only by the two top teams in the Canary Islands in a double-leg round, usually when both are in the Liga ACB. Gran Canaria won all the editions.

Castile-La Mancha 
The Trofeo Junta de Comunidades was a tournament played by the teams of Castile-La Mancha until 2010. The tournament was organized by the Regional Government.

Castile and León

Catalonia

Extremadura 
The Copa Extremadura was a basketball competition between the best teams of Extremadura. It was organized by the Basketball Federation of Extremadura from 2001 to 2011. CB Plasencia is the team with more titles.

The competition came back in 2014 with a three-team format of semifinal and final.

Performance by club

Galicia

Madrid

Valencian Community 
The Lliga Valenciana (in English, Valencian League) was a basketball competition between the best teams of the Valencian Community. It was organized by the Valencian Community Basketball Federation from 2004 to 2011. CB Lucentum Alicante is the last winner of the Cup.

Performance by club

References

Basketball cup competitions in Spain
Basketball in Spain